35028 Clan Line is a Southern Railway rebuilt Merchant Navy 4-6-2 class locomotive.

History

British Rail
35028 was built at Eastleigh Works in 1948. After a few weeks running in, it was allocated first to Dover and then to Stewarts Lane shed in London, from where it worked heavy trains on the trunk routes to the South East Channel ports, frequently working the prestige expresses, Golden Arrow and the Night Ferry. After rebuilding in 1959, it was initially allocated to Nine Elms shed, from where it headed such trains as the Bournemouth Belle and the Atlantic Coast Express. While working the latter in 1961, it was unofficially timed at  passing Axminster. On 2 July 1967, Clan Line hauled a farewell special from London Waterloo to Bournemouth and back and thus ended its British Railways career.

Preservation

One month after finishing the farewell special, Clan Line was bought by the Merchant Navy Locomotive Preservation Society from British Railways for £3,850. The group had wanted 35022 Holland America Line, but it was sent to Woodham Brothers scrapyard in South Wales, before they could purchase it, so the group purchased Clan Line instead. Clan Line was one of the first preserved locomotives to participate in steam specials, and in 1974 hauled its first revenue-earning train in preservation from Basingstoke to Westbury. Its sister engine 35022 Holland American Line was eventually rescued from Barry Scrapyard in 1986.

In the 1990s, 35028 Clan Line was chosen as the locomotive to haul the Belmond British Pullman using preserved Pullman carriages, with tours around Kent, Surrey, Oxford, Bath and Bristol. In September 1994, it was the first steam locomotive in the United Kingdom to be fitted with air brakes. In the early 2000s, when the locomotive went for overhaul, LNER Class A3 4472 Flying Scotsman took over those trains.

As of January 2015, Clan Line is based at Stewarts Lane TMD, Battersea. It returned to mainline operation in October 2006, when it resumed British Pullman duties and hauling the occasional enthusiast specials, although in 2012, the locomotive was used on a number of Cathedrals Express trips, filling in for locomotives that were not available for the tours.

35028 Clan Line was the first Merchant Navy class locomotive to operate on the mainline in preservation.

On 7 December 2018, Clan Line hauled the British Royal Train, taking the Prince of Wales to Cardiff Central railway station.

References

External links

 Merchant Navy Locomotive Preservation Society web site

Individual locomotives of Great Britain
Merchant Navy 35028
Standard gauge steam locomotives of Great Britain
Railway locomotives introduced in 1948